If I Had My Way is a studio album by American singer Nancy Wilson, released on June 3, 1997 by Columbia Records.

Track listing

Charts

References 

1997 albums
Nancy Wilson (jazz singer) albums
Columbia Records albums